Ryan Jay Jimenez (born September 17, 1983), better known as RJ Jimenez, is a Filipino singer and guitarist and former scholar of Pinoy Dream Academy.

Early life
Jimenez was born on September 17, 1983 in Pasig. He graduated Electronics and Communications Engineering at the University of Santo Tomas.

Discography

Studio album

Filmography

TV Guesting
Maalaala Mo Kaya

References

1983 births
Living people
21st-century Filipino male singers
Pinoy Dream Academy participants
Star Magic
People from Pasig
Singers from Metro Manila
University of Santo Tomas alumni